Raduga (in Russian Радуга, Rainbow) is the codename of a Soviet thermonuclear test, conducted on October 20, 1961, in Mityushikha Bay, Severny Island of Novaya Zemlya.

The test was conducted by the Northern Fleet. An R-13 missile with a thermonuclear warhead was fired from the submarine K-102. When the submarine reached the specified point in the Barents Sea, she could not establish her position due to cloudiness and snowfall. A R-13 missile without a nuclear warhead was fired first, which missed the aiming point by a wide margin. It was decided to continue the test in spite of bad weather. The second missile performed better and its miss distance was less than the previous one, and detonated at  height, yielding 1.45 megatons.

See also 
 Tsar bomba

References 
 
 Atomicforum: Database of Russian Atmospheric Nuclear Tests (compiled in web.archive.org)

Soviet nuclear weapons testing
1961 in the Soviet Union
1961 in military history
Explosions in 1961
Novaya Zemlya
October 1961 events in Europe